The Challenge Cup (Japanese チャレンジカップ (中央競馬)) is a Grade 3 horse race for Thoroughbreds aged three and over, run in late November or early December over a distance of 2000 metres on turf at Hanshin Racecourse.

The Challenge Cup was first run in 1950 and has held Grade 3 status since 1984. The race was run at Kyoto Racecourse in 1966 and 1995 and at Chukyo Racecourse in 1979, 1990, 1991, 1994 and 2006. It was run over 1800 metres from 2012 to 2016.

Winners since 2000

Earlier winners

 1984 - Nihon Pillow Winner
 1985 - Wakao Raiden
 1986 - Dokan Yashima
 1987 - President City
 1988 - Tanino Suesei
 1989 - Hatushiba Ace
 1990 - Foundry Popo
 1991 - Nuevo Tosho
 1992 - Let It Be
 1993 - Wish Dream
 1994 - Tsurumaru Girl
 1995 - My Shinzan
 1996 - Marvelous Sunday
 1997 - Shin Kaiun
 1998 - Run For The Dream
 1999 - Tsurumaru Tsuyoshi

See also
 Horse racing in Japan
 List of Japanese flat horse races

References

Turf races in Japan